Leah Lakshmi Piepzna-Samarasinha (born April 21, 1975, in Worcester, Massachusetts) is a U.S. /Canadian poet, writer, educator and social activist. Their writing and performance art focuses on documenting the stories of queer and trans people of color, abuse survivors, mixed-race people and diasporic South Asians and Sri Lankans. A central concern of their work is the interconnection of systems of colonialism, abuse and violence. They are also a writer and organizer within the disability justice movement.

They are queer, non-binary, and disabled.

Personal life 
Piepzna-Samarasinha was raised in Worcester, Massachusetts and are of Burgher/Tamil Sri Lankan and Irish/Roma ascent. They have lived in Brooklyn, Oakland, and Toronto and currently reside in South Seattle, Duwamish territories.

They are non-binary and use she and they pronouns. In comparison to climate activist Greta Thunberg, they have described themself as "an autistic femme."

Education 
Piepzna-Samarasinha graduated from Eugene Lang College The New School for Liberal Arts in New York City in 1997. They received their Master of Fine Arts from Mills College.

Career

Healing 
Piepzna-Samarashinha is a member of Bad Ass Visionary Healers, a California-based activist healing collective and has an "intuitive counseling" practice, Brownstargirl Tarot. they has been involved in organizing healing justice practice spaces at the Allied Media Conference, Safetyfest  and other spaces.

Performance art 
Piepzna-Samarasinha has been performing spoken word since 1998.

As a spoken word artist they have performed widely in the United States, Canada and Sri Lanka and have been featured at Bar 13, Michelle Tea's RADAR Reading Series, The Loft, Buddies in Bad Times Theatre, as well as at universities including Yale, Sarah Lawrence, Oberlin, Swarthmore and the University of Southern California.

In 2001, frustrated with the racism of the local white-dominated queer and trans poetry scene and the homophobia in the local poetry spaces for people of color, they began Browngirlworld, a reading series with the goal of creating a poetry and performance space for queer and trans people of color. Initially held weekly, the event became a biannual, large-scale poetry event  in partnership with the Toronto Women's Bookstore, bringing artists such as Mango Tribe and D'Lo.

Piepzna-Samarasinha began teaching writing to queer, trans and Two Spirit youth at Supporting Our Youth Toronto's Pink Ink program.

In 2004, inspired by radical Asian and Pacific Islander American (APIA) arts and poetry youth education programs at the APIA Spoken Word Summit, Piepzna-Samarasinha and Gein Wong started the Asian Arts Freedom School.

The following year, Piepzna-Samarasinha traveled to the San Francisco Bay Area to study poetry with Suheir Hammad at Voices of Our Nations, an experience they credit with changing their life as a writer.

In 2006, Piepzna-Samarasinha wrote and premiered their first one-woman show, Grown Woman Show, in which they discuss being "a queer girl of Sri Lankan descent" who is a survivor of incest perpetrated by their mother. Grown Woman Show has since been performed at the National Queer Arts Festival, Swarthmore College, Yale University, Reed College, and McGill University.

Later that year, Piepzna-Samarasinha met Ctheirry Galette on Friendster and created Mangos With Chili with the goal of creating an annual tour of performance artists who are queer and trans people of color. 
    
Piepzna-Samarasinha is also involved with the biannual Asian Pacific Islander Spoken Word and Poetry Summit.

They were the 2009-2010 Artist in Residence at UC Berkeley's June Jordan's Poetry for the People. From 2009 to the present, they has been a commissioned performer with Sins Invalid, the national performance organization of queer people with disabilities and chronic illnesses.

While in Toronto, with Syrus Marcus Ware, they co-created Performance.Disability.Art (PDA), a performance based disability arts collective. Through PDA, the pair co-curated Crip Your World: an Intergalactic Mad, Sick and Disabled Extravaganza for Mayworks Festival.

Teaching 
In 2001, Piepzna-Samarasinha taught writing to LGBTQ youth at Supporting Our Youth Toronto (SOY) through the Pink Ink program. This included working with the zine 10 Reasons to Riot which won Best Zine in Toronto in 2006.  For this work they were awarded the Community Service to Youth Award from the City of Toronto in 2004.

In 2005, along with Gein Wong, co-founded the Asian Arts Freedom School, a community-controlled school teaching writing, performance and radical education on Asian/Pacific Islander history to youth. They were also involved with The Canadian Sri Lankan Women's Action Network, an activist group seeking to promote peace with justice through a feminist lens to end Sri Lanka's 24 year civil war.

In 2007, they moved back to the U.S. and studied community-based poetic teaching through University of California Berkeley's June Jordan's Poetry for the People (P4P) Program, culminating in teaching for and being P4P's visiting writer from 2009 to 2010. She has taught in living rooms and college campuses and everywhere in between, and loves and believes in the delicious liberation of places to learn and live freely outside traditional school systems.

Writing 
Piepzna-Samarasinha has published nine books independently, been included in ten anthologies, and edited two anthologies. Their work has also appeared in Yes, Vice, Room, Autostraddle, ColorLines, NOW, Xtra, Bitch,  theirizons and other publications.

Awards and honors

Self

Written works

Bibliography

Anthology contributions 

 Without a Net: The Female Experience of Growing Up Working Class, edited by Michelle Tea (2004)
 Persistence: All Ways Butch and Femme, edited by Ivan E. Coyote and Zena Sharman (2011)
 Letters Lived: Radical Reflections, Revolutionary Paths (2013)
 Namjai: A Tribute Anthology of Bay Area Asian Pacific Islander Poets, Volume 1, edited by The ReWrite (2013)
 Octavia's Brood: Science Fiction Stories from Social Justice Movements, edited by Adrienne Maree Brown and Walidah Imarisha (2015)
 Whatever Gets You Through: Twelve Women on Life After Sexual Assault, edited by Jen Sookfong Lee and Stacey May Fowles (2019)
 Disability Visibility: First-Person Stories from the Twenty-first Century, edited by Alice Wong (2020)
 Disabled Voices Anthology, edited by S.B. Smith (2020)
 Pleasure Activism: The Politics of Feeling Good, edited by Adrienne Maree Brown (2020)
 Read Women: An Anthology, edited by Amanda Fuller, Carolann Madden, and Carly Joy Miller (2020)

Anthologies edited 

 The Revolution Starts at Home: Confronting Intimate Violence Within Activist Communities, with Ching-In Chen and Jai Dulani (2011)
 Beyond Survival: Strategies and Stories from the Transformative Justice Movement, with Ejeris Dixon (2020)

Authored works 

 Dirty River: A Queer Femme of Color Dreaming Her Way Home
 Consensual Genocide (2006)
 Love Cake: Poems (2011)
 Brown Femme Survivor (2013)
 Bodymap: Poems (2015)
 Care Work: Dreaming Disability Justice (2018)
 Tonguebreaker: Poems (2019)
 Bridge of Flowers, illustrated by Syrus Marcus Ware (2019)
 The Future is Disabled (2022)

References

External links

brownstargirl Website
Poetry example
Supporting Our Youth (SOY) Website
Mangos With Chili
 TSAR Publications
rabble.ca interview by Elizabeth Ruth

Writers from Toronto
American people of Sri Lankan descent
Canadian people of Sri Lankan descent
Writers from Worcester, Massachusetts
Canadian LGBT poets
LGBT people from Massachusetts
LGBT memoirists
Eugene Lang College alumni
The New School alumni
1975 births
Living people
Journalists from Toronto
American writers of Sri Lankan descent
Lambda Literary Award for Lesbian Poetry winners
American newspaper journalists
Canadian newspaper journalists
Canadian women journalists
American women journalists
American women poets
Canadian women poets
21st-century American poets
21st-century Canadian poets
21st-century American women writers
21st-century Canadian women writers
American women memoirists
21st-century American memoirists
Canadian women memoirists
Canadian memoirists
People on the autism spectrum
American LGBT people of Asian descent
Mills College alumni
21st-century Canadian LGBT people